Butterflies are flying insects.

Butterflies may also refer to:

Film, television and theatre
 Butterflies (1993 film), an Indian Malayalam film
 Butterflies (2009 film), a documentary
 Butterflies (2018 film), a Turkish film
 Butterflies (TV series), a British series starring Wendy Craig and Geoffrey Palmer
 The Butterflies (play), an 1894 American play

Music
 The Butterflys, a 1960s-era group signed to Red Bird Records

Albums
 Butterflies (Basia album), 2018
 Butterflies (Bump of Chicken album), 2016

Songs
 "Butterflies" (3+2 song), 2010
 "Butterflies" (AJ Tracey song), 2018
 "Butterflies" (Kacey Musgraves song), 2018
 "Butterflies" (Michael Jackson song), 2001
 "Butterflies" (Patti Page song), 1953 
 "Butterflies" (Tone Damli song), 2009
 "Butterflies", by 24kGoldn from the 2021 album El Dorado
 "Butterflies", by Baker Boy from the 2021 album Gela
 "Butterflies", by Gabbie Hanna from the 2019 album 2WayMirror
 "Butterflies", by Juliana Hatfield from the 2010 album Peace & Love 
 "Butterflies", by Max & Ali Gatie, 2021
 "Butterflies", by Medina from the 2012 album Forever
 "Butterflies", by Minipop from the 2007 album A New Hope

Sports
 The Butterflies (foaled 1892), an American Thoroughbred racemare, winner of the 1894 Belmont Futurity Stakes

Other uses
 Butterflies (Van Gogh series), an 1889-1890 painting series by Van Gogh

See also
 Butterfly (disambiguation)
 Butterflies in the stomach, an English expression
 Good-byes and Butterflies, 1970 album by Five Man Electrical Band
 Mirabal sisters, or "Las Mariposas" ("the Butterflies"), Dominican political dissidents active in the 1960s